|}

The Prix de Malleret is a Group 2 flat horse race in France open to three-year-old thoroughbred fillies. It is run at Saint-Cloud over a distance of 2,400 metres (about 1½ miles), and it is scheduled to take place each year in late June.

History
The event is named after Malleret, the location of a former stud farm in the Médoc region of France. The original version was a 1,600-metre race for three-year-olds of either gender.

A new version restricted to fillies was established in 1907. It was initially contested over 2,000 metres at Longchamp. It served as a consolation for fillies defeated in the Prix de Diane. It was abandoned throughout World War I, with no running from 1915 to 1918.

The Prix de Malleret was cancelled once during World War II, in 1940. It was staged at Maisons-Laffitte in 1943 and 1944.

The present system of race grading was introduced in 1971, and for a period the Prix de Malleret held Group 3 status. It was promoted to Group 2 level in 1977.

The Prix de Malleret was extended to 2,400 metres in 1987. It was transferred to Saint-Cloud in 2001. It is currently run on the same day as the Grand Prix de Saint-Cloud.

Records
Leading jockey (7 wins):
 Charles Semblat – Edera (1923), Lucide (1925), Carissima (1926), Calandria (1929), Merveille (1930), Nantua (1931), Samos (1935)

Leading trainer (9 wins):
 André Fabre – Zoumorrod (1987), Wemyss Bight (1993), Bonash (1994), Sage et Jolie (1995), Diamilina (2001), Legerete (2007), Treat Gently (2008), Strathspey (2017), Waldlied (2018)

Leading owner (6 wins):
 Marcel Boussac – Lasarte (1920), Carissima (1926), Bellecour (1927), Argolide (1938), Damaka (1951), Licata (1972)

Winners since 1979

Earlier winners

 1907: Aux Armes
 1908: Mafia II
 1909: Messaouda
 1910: Passe Rose
 1911: Allamanda
 1912: Wagram
 1913: Ardeche
 1914: Rivista
 1915–18: no race
 1919: Stearine
 1920: Lasarte
 1921: Ad Gloriam
 1922: Honeysuckle
 1923: Edera
 1924: Creditable
 1925: Lucide
 1926: Carissima
 1927: Bellecour
 1928: Gratis
 1929: Calandria
 1930: Merveille
 1931: Nantua
 1932: Allumeuse
 1933: Napee
 1934: Emeraude
 1935: Samos
 1936: Love Call / Renommee *
 1937: Barberybush
 1938: Argolide
 1939: Zoazo
 1940: no race
 1941: Nibelle
 1942: Guirlande
 1943: Blue-Berry
 1944: La Belle du Canet
 1945:
 1946:
 1947: Madelon
 1948: Fair Dolly
 1949: Camargue
 1950: Neda
 1951: Damaka
 1952:
 1953: Noory
 1954: Bethora
 1955: Picounda
 1956: Fast Jane
 1957: Denisy
 1958: Torbella
 1959: Mefair
 1960: Sea Nymph
 1961: White Heather
 1962: Wakamba
 1963: Irma la Douce
 1964: Mirna
 1965: Dark Wave
 1966: Si Sage
 1967: Ingrette
 1968: Hardiesse
 1969: Glaneuse
 1970: Chatter Box
 1971: Dixie
 1972: Licata
 1973: Virunga
 1974: Azurella
 1975: Infra Green
 1976: Antrona
 1977: Les Saintes Claires
 1978: Calderina

* The 1936 race was a dead-heat and has joint winners.

See also
 List of French flat horse races

References
 France Galop / Racing Post:

 galop.courses-france.com:
 1907–1919, 1920–1949, 1950–1979, 1980–present
 france-galop.com – A Brief History: Prix de Malleret.
 galopp-sieger.de – Prix de Malleret.
 horseracingintfed.com – International Federation of Horseracing Authorities – Prix de Malleret (2016).
 pedigreequery.com – Prix de Malleret.

Flat horse races for three-year-old fillies
Saint-Cloud Racecourse
Horse races in France